Bucknor may refer to:

People 
Bucknor (surname)

Places  
Jamaica
 Bucknors Bay, an alternate name of Rio Nuevo Bay in Jamaica, at the outlet of the Rio Nuevo.

See also 
Buckner (disambiguation)